The near-open central vowel, or near-low central vowel, is a type of vowel sound, used in some spoken languages.

In English this vowel is most typically transcribed with the symbol , i.e. as if it were open-mid back.

Much like ,  is a versatile symbol that is not defined for roundedness and that can be used for vowels that are near-open central, near-open near-front, near-open near-back, open-mid central, open central or an (often unstressed) vowel with variable height, backness and/or roundedness that is produced in that general area.

Features 

 It is undefined for roundedness, which means that it can be either rounded or unrounded. In practice however, the unrounded variant is more common.

Occurrence 
In the following list,  is assumed to be unrounded. Some instances of the latter may actually be fully open.

See also 
 Turned a
 Index of phonetics articles

Notes

References

External links
 

Near-open vowels
Central vowels